Vladimir Shmakov (born 8 February 1973) is an Uzbekistani judoka. He won Asian gold medal in the half-middleweight division in 1996 Asian Judo Championships. He also competed in the men's half-middleweight event at the 1996 Summer Olympics.

References 

1973 births
Living people
Uzbekistani male judoka
Asian Games medalists in judo
Judoka at the 1994 Asian Games
Asian Games bronze medalists for Uzbekistan
Medalists at the 1994 Asian Games
Olympic judoka of Uzbekistan
Judoka at the 1996 Summer Olympics
20th-century Uzbekistani people
21st-century Uzbekistani people